The 58th Filipino Academy of Movie Arts and Sciences Awards Night was held on December 13, 2010 at GSIS Teatro, Diosdado Macapagal Boulevard, Pasay.

Dukot, by ATD Entertainment, is the recipient of this edition's FAMAS Award for Best Picture.

Awards

Major Awards
Winners are listed first and highlighted with boldface.

{| class=wikitable
|-
! style="background:#EEDD82; width:50%" | Best Picture
! style="background:#EEDD82; width:50%" | Best Director
|-
| valign="top" |
 Dukot 
 Mano Po 6: A Mother's Love 
 Sagrada Familia 
 I Love You, Goodbye
 In My Life 
 You Changed My Life 
 Ang Panday
| valign="top" |
 Joel Lamangan — Dukot
 Joel Lamangan — Sagrada Familia
 Joel Lamangan  — Mano Po 6: A Mother's Love
 Laurice Guillen — I Love You, Goodbye
 Mac Alejandre — Ang Panday 
 Olivia Lamasan — In My Life 
 Brillante Mendoza — Kinatay 
|-
! style="background:#EEDD82; width:50%" | Best Actor
! style="background:#EEDD82; width:50%" | Best Actress
|-
| valign="top" |
 Allen Dizon — Dukot
 Piolo Pascual — Love Me Again (Land Down Under)
 Coco Martin — Kinatay
 John Lloyd Cruz — You Changed My Life
 John Lloyd Cruz — In My Life
 Gabby Concepcion — I Love You, Goodbye
 Ramon "Bong" Revilla — Ang Panday 
| valign="top" |
 Lovi Poe — Sagrada Familia
 Iza Calzado — Dukot
 Janice de Belen — Last Viewing
 Sarah Geronimo — You Changed My Life
 Angelica Panganiban — I Love You, Goodbye
 Eugene Domingo — Kimmy Dora
 Sharon Cuneta — Mano Po 6: A Mother's Love
|-
! style="background:#EEDD82; width:50%" | Best Supporting Actor
! style="background:#EEDD82; width:50%" | Best Supporting Actress
|-
| valign="top" |
 Emilio Garcia — Sagrada Familia
 Baron Geisler — Nandito Ako Nagmamahal Sa'Yo
 Phillip Salvador — Ang Panday
 Robert Arevalo — Dukot
 Ricky Davao  — Love Me Again (Land Down Under)
 Luis Manzano  — In My Life
| valign="top" |
 Gloria Diaz — Sagrada Familia
 Manilyn Reynes — Ded na si Lolo
 Rhian Ramos — Ang Panday
 Gina Alajar — Dukot
 Heart Evangelista — Mano Po 6: A Mother's Love
 Dimples Romana — Love Me Again (Land Down Under)
 Kim Chiu — I Love You, Goodbye
|-
! style="background:#EEDD82; width:50%" | Best Child Actor
! style="background:#EEDD82; width:50%" | Best Child Actress
|-
| valign="top" |
 Robert Villar — Ang Panday
 Nash Aguas — Kamoteng Kahoy
 Robert Villar — Kamoteng Kahoy
 BJ Forbes — Ded na si Lolo
 Nash Aguas — Love Me Again (Land Down Under)
 JP Mesde — Tulak
| valign="top" |
 Mara Panganiban — The Last Viewing
 Justine Rose Rosal — Sagrada Familia
|- 
! style="background:#EEDD82; width:50%" | Best Screenplay
! style="background:#EEDD82; width:50%" | Best Cinematography
|-
| valign="top" |
 R.J. Nuevas, Carlo J. Caparas — Ang Panday
 Roy Iglesias — Mano Po 6: A Mother's Love
 Bonifacio Ilagan — Dukot
 Raymond Lee, Olivia M. Lamasan — In My Life
 Arah Jell Badayos, Jewel C. Castro — Love Me Again (Land Down Under)
 Armando Lao — Kinatay
 Chie Floresca, Norissa R. Soriano, Carmi Raymundo — You Changed My Life
| valign="top" |
 Monino Duque — Dukot
 Charlie Peralta — In My Life
 Shayne Sarte — Kimmy Dora
 Charlie Peralta — Love Me Again (Land Down Under)
  Gary Gardoce — Last Viewing
  Regiben Romana — Ang Panday
  Lee Meily — I Love You, Goodbye
|-
! style="background:#EEDD82; width:50%" | Best Art Direction
! style="background:#EEDD82; width:50%" | Best Sound
|-
| valign="top" |
 Edgar Martin Littaua — Dukot
 Edgar Martin Littaua — I Love You, Goodbye
 Elfren Vibar — In My Life
 Richard Somes — Ang Panday
 Brillante Mendoza — Kinatay
 Tony Chiong — Last Viewing
 Adelina Leung — Kimmy Dora
| valign="top" |
 Ditoy Aguila — Ang Panday
  Albert Michael Idioma — In My Life
 Albert Michael Idioma — Kimmy Dora
 Alfredo Ongleo — Dukot
 Pepe Manikan — Last Viewing
 Albert Michael Idioma — I Love You, Goodbye
|-
! style="background:#EEDD82; width:50%" | Best Editing
! style="background:#EEDD82; width:50%" | Best Story
|-
| valign="top" |
 Charliebebs Gohetia — Dukot
 Marya Ignacio — Ang Panday
 Lee Mi Soon — Last Viewing
 Manet A. Dayrit, Efren Jarlego — I Love You, Goodbye
 Vanessa De Leon — Kimmy Dora
 Kats Serraon — Kinatay
 Marya Ignacio — In My Life
| valign="top" |
 Carlo J. Caparas — Ang Panday
 Raquel Villavicencio, Joel Lamangan — Sagrada Familia
 Romualdo Avellanosa, Roni Bertubin — Last Viewing
 Roy Iglesias — Mano Po 6: A Mother's Love
 Vanessa R. Valdez — I Love You, Goodbye
 Joel Lamangan, Bonifacio Ilagan — Dukot
 Raymond Lee, Olivia M. Lamasan — In My Life
|-
! style="background:#EEDD82; width:50%" | Best Theme Song
! style="background:#EEDD82; width:50%" | Best Musical Score
|-
| valign="top" |
  "Panday" — Ang Panday (Ely Buendia)
 "Yaya Angelina" — Yaya and Angelina: The Spoiled Brat Movie (Ogie Alcasid)
 "Nandito Ako" — Nandito Ako Nagmamahal Sa'Yo (Frank Lee Lorenzo)
 ""I Don't Want You To Go""  — Love Me Again (Land Down Under) (Piolo Pascual)
 "Ang Buhay Nga Naman" — Ded na si Lolo (Noel Cabangon)
 "You Changed My Life in a Moment" — You Changed My Life (Sarah Geronimo)
| valign="top" |
 Von de Guzman — I Love You, Goodbye
 Nonong Buencamino — In My Life
 Brian Cua — Kimmy Dora
 Von de Guzman — Ang Panday
 Pepe Manikan — Last Viewing
 Lucien Letaba — Dukot 
|}

Special AwardsLou Salvador Sr. Memorial AwardLou VelosoGerman Moreno Youth Achievement AwardEnchong Dee
Joshua Dionisio
Erich Gonzales
Barbie Forteza
Andi Eigenmann
Bea Binene
Jake Vargas
Matteo GuidicelliGolden Artist AwardSharon CunetaExemplary Achievement AwardDolphyPresidential AwardHerbert BautistaFAMAS Lifetime Achievement AwardRustica CarpioFAMAS Hall of Fame'''
Jesse Lucas (Musical Score)

References

External links
FAMAS Awards 

FAMAS Award
FAM
FAM